Pelli Chesukundam is a 1997 Indian Telugu-language film directed by Muthyala Subbaiah, produced by C. Venkat Raju and G. Siva Raju under Geetha Chitra International. It stars Venkatesh, Soundarya and Laila, with music composed by Koti.

Plot
Pelli Chesukundham is a story of how Anand, a multi-millionaire, supports Shanti, victim of a rape. Shanti witnesses a murder committed by Kali Charan and reports it in the police station. His brother rapes her to take revenge and her family doesn't want her to stay with them. Anand, knowing everything, welcomes her and gives her shelter in his house, though society disapproves of it.

Anand slowly falls in love with Shanti, but Shanti thinks highly of him and doesn't want to get close with him. Meanwhile, Anand's cousin Laila returns from the US and pursues Anand. She slowly realises that Anand was in love with Shanti and leaves him. Anand and Shanti at last reconcile and marry.

Cast

 Venkatesh as Anand
 Soundarya as Shanti
 Laila as Laila
 Keerikkadan Jose as Kaali Charan
 Devan as Krishna Prasad
 Satya Prakash
 Brahmanandam as Brahmam 
 Sudhakar as Subba Rao 
 Tanikella Bharani 
 Venu Madhav 
 Narra Venkateswara Rao as S.P.
 Posani Krishna Murali as S.I. Ramesh
 Subhalekha Sudhakar as Siva
 Subbaraya Sharma 
 Suthi Velu as Shanti's father
 Kallu Chidambaram
 Kishore Rathi
 Chandra Mouli 
 Gadiraju Subba Rao 
 Echuri
 Annapurna as Shanti's mother 
 Sumitra as Anand's mother
 Rajitha
 Ragini
 Aswini (Rudra) as Radhika
 Annuja 
 Radha Prashanthi 
 Lata 
 Sabita
 Nallini 
 Master Mahendra 
 Baby Soumya
 Niranjan Varma

Soundtrack

The music was composed by Koti. The music was released by SUPREME Music Company.

Remakes

Reception 
A critic from Andhra Today said that the film "has a message to convey to the audience and at the same time it has all the ingredients to make it a box-office hit. It drives home some truths and solutions on the social stigma attached to rape victims and the double standards of people".

References

External links
 

1997 films
Telugu films remade in other languages
1990s Telugu-language films
Films scored by Koti
Films directed by Muthyala Subbaiah